The Swinging Confessors, also known as Intimacy and The Married Priest, is a  1970 Italian comedy film written and directed by Marco Vicario.

Plot    
A young Sicilian priest who moved to Rome comes into contact with the upper class and receives constant sexual solicitations. He then falls in love with a prostitute and asks his superiors for permission to marry her while remaining a priest. But she understands that for him the priestly mission is everything and decides to leave him alone.

Cast 
 Lando Buzzanca: Don Salvatore 
 Rossana Podestà: Silvia 
 Salvo Randone: Don Clemente 
 Magali Noël: Miss Bellini 
 Luciano Salce: Monsignor Torelli 
 Silvia Dionisio: Liliana Bellini 
 Mariangela Melato: Prostitute
 Enrico Maria Salerno: Don Calogero 
 Barbara Bouchet: Miss Marchio 
 Karin Schubert: Blonde on bicycle  
 Ely Galleani: Paola

See also    
 List of Italian films of 1970

References

External links

1970 films
Commedia sexy all'italiana
1970s sex comedy films
Films directed by Marco Vicario
Films about clerical celibacy
1970 comedy films
1970s Italian-language films
1970s Italian films